Timothy Zúñiga-Brown is an American diplomat. He was chargé d'affaires of the Embassy of the United States, Havana between July 31, 2020 - July 14, 2022.

Previously, he was the Chargé d'Affaires at the U.S. Embassy in Nassau from January 2009 until September 9, 2009, as well as to Ecuador, July 2011 until April 2012.  From August 2015 to September 2018, he was Consul General and Principal Officer at US Consultate General, Monterrey, Mexico.

References

Ambassadors of the United States to Ecuador
Ambassadors of the United States to the Bahamas
American consuls
Year of birth missing (living people)
Living people